Baron Farrer, of Abinger in the County of Surrey, was a title in the Peerage of the United Kingdom. It was created on 22 June 1893 for the statistician and civil servant Sir Thomas Farrer, 1st Baronet.  He had already been created a baronet on 22 October 1883. The titles became extinct on the death of the fifth Baron on 16 December 1964.

Farrer baronetcy (1883) 
Thomas Henry Farrer,  1st Baronet (1819–1899) (created Baron Farrer in 1893)

Baron Farrer (1893) 
Thomas Henry Farrer,  1st Baron Farrer (1819–1899)
Thomas Cecil Farrer, 2nd Baron Farrer (1859–1940)
Cecil Claude Farrer, 3rd Baron Farrer (1893–1948)
Oliver Thomas Farrer, 4th Baron Farrer (1904–1954)
Anthony Thomas Farrer, 5th Baron Farrer (1910–1964)

Male-line family tree

References

External links 

 http://www.leighrayment.com/lords.htm
 http://www.thepeerage.com/farrer.htm
 http://www.stirnet.com/ (subscription only)

Extinct baronies in the Peerage of the United Kingdom
Noble titles created in 1893